Coeloneurum is a genus of flowering plants belonging to the family Solanaceae.

Its native range is Hispaniola.

Species:
 Coeloneurum ferrugineum (Spreng.) Urb.

References

Solanaceae
Solanaceae genera